Fort Mudge is an unincorporated community in Brantley County in the U.S. state of Georgia.

History
Fort Mudge (the fort after which the community is named) is described as "a temporary fortification during the Florida war", established in 1813.  It was abandoned at the end of the war, although it may have been briefly reoccupied in 1838 during the Second Seminole War.

In popular culture
It is occasionally mentioned in the comic strip Pogo.

Species of special concern
The Georgia Department of Natural Resources lists several species of special concern in or near Fort Mudge.
 Ctenium floridanum Florida Orange-grass
 Gopherus polyphemus Gopher Tortoise
 Hartwrightia floridana Hartwrightia
 Neofiber alleni Round-tailed Muskrat
 Ophisaurus compressus Island Glass Lizard
 Picoides borealis Red-cockaded Woodpecker
 Pteroglossaspis ecristata Crestless Plume Orchid
 Scirpus etuberculatus Canby's Club-rush

Roads
U.S. Route 1 (concurrent with U.S. Route 23 and Georgia State Route 4 here, and also identified as Jacksonville Highway) runs through Fort Mudge.

References

Unincorporated communities in Brantley County, Georgia
Unincorporated communities in Georgia (U.S. state)